A party favor is a small gift given to guests.

Party Favor may also refer to:

 Party Favor (DJ), American DJ and electronic dance music producer
 Party Favor (My Little Pony), franchise product of My Little Pony
 "The Party Favor" (The O.C. episode)
 "Party Favor" (song), a song by American singer-songwriter Billie Eilish from her extended play Don't Smile at Me (2017)
 "Party Favors", a song by American singer Tinashe from her album Nightride (2016)